Tabulated below are the performance of the top-3 finish places on the medal table and overall rankings for this teams on the Summer Paralympics and Winter Paralympics, based on individual Games medals tables.

Summer Paralympics

List by games

List by team

Winter Paralympics

List by games

List by team

External links 
 The Geopolitics of Winter Olympic Medal Counts, The Atlantic, February 7, 2014
 One Benefit of Hosting the Olympics? More Medals, NPR, August 8, 2012

Medal tables at multi-sport events
Paralympic Games
All-time
Paralympics-related lists